Bufotes surdus, also known as Iranian earless toad, Iranian toad, Pakistan toad, or Luristan toad (not to be confused with Lorestan toad), is a species of toad in the family Bufonidae. It is found in southern Iran and western Pakistan. There is also an isolated record from eastern Iraq.

Appearance and subspecies
Unlike most species of Bufotes but similar to its close relative B. luristanicus, it has no visible tympanum (either absent or tiny and covered by the skin), hence the common name "earless toad". It is typically quite dull and plain-coloured, but it may have some inconspicuous greenish markings, especially to the limbs, and occasionally a larger amount of small greenish ring-shaped spots.

Two subspecies are recognized, but their separation is questionable (annulatus was described based on features that often are individually variable in toads) and require further study.

Common name ring-spotted earless toad can be used to specifically refer to Bufotes surdus annulatus.

Habitat and conservation
Breeding takes place during the monsoons when males gather in temporal pools. The eggs are deposited around vegetation in ponds. During the dry season these animals seek damp areas under stones and within vegetation. It can be a locally common species, but its ecology is little known and it has sometimes been confused with juveniles of other Bufotes species. It is threatened by intensification of agriculture, including agricultural pollution. Extended periods of drought can cause local population declines. Some populations occur within protected areas.

References

surdus
Amphibians of Iran
Amphibians of Iraq
Amphibians of Pakistan
Amphibians described in 1891
Taxa named by George Albert Boulenger
Taxonomy articles created by Polbot